Five referendums were held in Switzerland during 1922. The first three were held on 11 June on the process of obtaining Swiss citizenship, on expelling foreigners and on the eligibility of federal officials to stand in National Council elections. All three were rejected. The fourth was held on 24 September on an amendment of the criminal law regarding constitutional and domestic security, and was also rejected. The fifth was held on 3 December on introducing a one-off property tax, and was rejected by a wide margin.

Background
The referendums on citizenship, expelling foreigners, federal officials and the one-off property tax were all popular initiatives, which required a double majority; a majority of the popular vote and majority of the cantons. The decision of each canton was based on the vote in that canton. Full cantons counted as one vote, whilst half cantons counted as half. The referendum on the criminal law was an optional referendum, which required only a majority of the public vote.

Results

Citizenship

Expulsion of foreigners

Electoral eligibility of federal officials

Amendment of the criminal law

One-off property tax

References

1922 referendums
1922 in Switzerland
Referendums in Switzerland